Quetzaltepec can refer to:

San Miguel Quetzaltepec, Oaxaca
San Salvador (volcano) (Quetzaltepec is the native name for the volcano.)
Quezaltepeque, Chiquimula, in Guatemala